Arvind Mediratta (born 1967) is an Indian business executive, and the managing director and chief executive officer at METRO Cash & Carry, the Indian arm of German wholesaler Metro AG, since February 2016. He is from New Delhi, India.

Education 
Mediratta received a B.Tech in Chemical Engineering from Indian Institute of Technology, Delhi in 1989. He did his MBA in Marketing and Finance from Indian Institute of Management, Calcutta in 1991, and was conferred with the Roll of Honour at the institute. In 2002, he was a part of the General Management Program of the University of Michigan - Stephen M. Ross School of Business.

Career 
Mediratta began his career with Procter & Gamble (P&G) in 1991 to handle marketing and branding strategy in India, Bangkok, and Singapore for a decade. He was the chief marketing officer at Marico in 2001 and Whirlpool (India) in 2003. As the chief marketing officer for South Asia for Yum! Brands in 2005, he handled Taco Bell, Pizza Hut, KFC, and A&W in India, Bangladesh, Sri Lanka, and Mauritius.

Mediratta joined Walmart (India) in 2007 and set up Walmart's Cash and Carry business; later, he was elevated as its chief operating officer and handled its India operations. He joined  Walmart (USA) as the global officer and vice-president for operations (Texas) for the entire US market, followed by being the global officer and vice-president of merchandising for Fresh until 2016.

Mediratta joined Metro Cash and Carry, India as its chief executive officer and managing director in 2016, leading its expansion into new geographies, transformation into a customer-centric enterprise, and making it a profitable billion dollar company.

He is the Chair of  Federation of Indian Chambers of Commerce and Industry (FICCI) Committee on Retail and Internal Trade since 2020. He was also the Co-Chair of Food Processing Committee, Confederation of Indian Industry (CII) in 2019. Mediratta has been involved in the wholesale and the retail economy with Fortune 500 corporations for over three decades.

Recognition 
 Top 8 Marketers in India - The Economic Times (2003)
 50 most Powerful People in Media, Advertising and Marketing in India - PITCH (2004)
 25 Hottest Young Executives in India - Business Today (2006)
 Most Promising Business Leaders of Asia - The Economic Times (2020)
 Inspiring CEOs of 2021 - The Economic Times (2021)
 Food and Grocery Retail Icons of India, 2022 - Images Group 
 Business Icons of India 2022 - Marksmen (2022)

Personal life 
Mediratta is married to Rashmi Mediratta, an art enthusiast, and has two children. He is also the Chairperson, Retail and Internal Trade Committee, FICCI

References 

Living people
Indian chief executives
Indian business executives
Walmart people
Indian Institute of Management Calcutta alumni
IIT Delhi alumni
1967 births